Continuous optimization is a branch of optimization in applied mathematics.

As opposed to discrete optimization, the variables used in the objective function are required to be continuous variables—that is, to be chosen from a set of real values between which there are no gaps (values from intervals of the real line). Because of this continuity assumption, continuous optimization allows the use of calculus techniques.

References

Mathematical optimization